Jason Christie (born April 25, 1969) is a Canadian former professional ice hockey player. He is currently an assistant coach with the Buffalo Sabres of the National Hockey League.

He was previously the head coach of the Bloomington PrairieThunder in the Central Hockey League (CHL), the Ontario Reign and the Tulsa Oilers of the ECHL. On December 10, 2015, Christie became the winningest head coach in ECHL history when his Tulsa Oilers defeated the Idaho Steelheads 4–2 at home in Tulsa's BOK Center. On June 6, 2017, Christie was named vice president of hockey operations and head coach for the Jacksonville Icemen. After four seasons in Jacksonville, he was hired by the Sabres as an assistant coach.

Awards and honours
CHL Coach of the Year (2010–11)
All-ECHL Second Team Coach (2011–12)

References

External links

1969 births
Bloomington PrairieThunder coaches
Charlotte Checkers (1993–2010) players
Columbus Chill players
Hamilton Canucks players
Living people
Manitoba Moose (IHL) players
Milwaukee Admirals players
Peoria Rivermen (AHL) players
Portland Pirates players
Saskatoon Blades players
Utah Grizzlies (ECHL) coaches
New England Stingers players
Canadian ice hockey right wingers
Canadian ice hockey coaches